Lispe sociabilis is a species of house fly in the family Muscidae.

Distribution
Canada, United States

References

Muscidae
Articles created by Qbugbot
Insects described in 1862
Diptera of North America
Taxa named by Hermann Loew